Andrew Jackson Transue (January 12, 1903 – June 24, 1995) was an American politician and attorney from the U.S. state of Michigan. He served one term in the United States House of Representatives from 1937 to 1939.

Early life and career
Transue was born in Clarksville, Michigan, and attended the local schools. He graduated from the Detroit College of Law, LL.B., 1926 and J.D., 1968.  He was admitted to the bar in 1926 and commenced the practice of law in Detroit in 1926 and Flint, Michigan, in 1927. He also served as prosecuting attorney of Genesee County in 1933 and 1937.

Congress
In 1936, Transue defeated incumbent Republican William W. Blackney to be elected as a Democrat from Michigan's 6th congressional district to the 75th United States Congress, serving from January 3, 1937, to January 3, 1939. He was an unsuccessful candidate for reelection in 1938, losing to Blackney.

Life after Congress
Transue resumed the practice of law after leaving Congress and was a resident of Flint until his death. He was the attorney for the plaintiff, and won, in the 1951–1952 U.S. Supreme Court case Morissette v. United States.

References

1903 births
1995 deaths
Detroit College of Law alumni
Democratic Party members of the United States House of Representatives from Michigan
20th-century American politicians